Lublin is a Polish parliamentary constituency in the Lublin Voivodeship.  It elects fifteen members of the Sejm.

The district has the number '6' and is named after the city of Lublin.  It includes the counties of Janów Lubelski, Kraśnik, Łęczna, Lubartów, Lublin, Łuków, Opole Lubelskie, Puławy, Ryki, and Świdnik and the city county of Lublin.

List of members

2019-2023

Footnotes

Electoral districts of Poland
Lublin
Lublin Voivodeship